Singha Durbar is a 2015 Nepalese television series. It revolves around the story of Nepal's first Female Prime Minister who undergoes various challenges in her quest to establish a governance system of transparency, accountability and collaborative leadership

Singha Durbar  is Nepal's first Futuristic Political Drama directed by Mukundo: Mask of Desire and 'Karma' famed Director Tsering Rhitar Sherpa and produced by Yubakar Raj Rajkarnikar.

The television series is a joint production of Search for Common Ground Nepal (SFCG) and Mila Productions. Supported by USAID Nepal, the television series aspires to promote positive role models in governance, and a culture of collaboration between the government and the general public.

Cast

Plot

The television drama 'Singha Durbar' revolves around the story of Nepal's first Female Prime Minister who undergoes various challenges in her quest to establish a governance system of transparency, accountability and collaborative leadership. .Gauri Malla, is the protagonist of Singha Durbar. Her portrayal of Nepal's first female Prime Minister enshrines the possibility of women's leadership in the near future, and also encourages an ideal world where female leadership is respected and acknowledged.

Episodes

References

2010s Nepalese television series
2015 Nepalese television series debuts
Nepalese television series
Nepalese television sitcoms